Kayabağı can refer to the following villages in Turkey:

 Kayabağı, Batman
 Kayabağı, Daday